Dave Morrison (born 30 November 1974) is an English former professional footballer.

Morrison started his professional football career with Chelmsford City, before being sold to Peterborough United in May 1994 for a fee of £50,000. During his time with The Posh, Morrison made 77 appearances and scored 12 goals. He was also sent out to Rushden & Diamonds on loan in October 1996.

March 1997 saw Morrison move to Leyton Orient for a fee of £25,000. Morrison played a total of 46 games and scored three goals during his time with The O's. He was also loaned out to Dover Athletic in January 2000.

Morrison then moved to Bohemians in the summer of 2000 where he played in European wins against Aberdeen and FC Kaiserslautern. He also played a big part as Bohemians won the League and Cup Double in May 2001. He left Bohemians in December 2004, joining Kidderminster Harriers, but was released in January 2005.

Morrison then returned to the English game with Tamworth in March 2005, where he played with the Conference National side until the end of the 2005/06 season when he was released and joined Moor Green in July 2005.

In the 2007 close season Moor Green merged with local rivals Solihull Borough and like many of his Moor Green teammates Morrison joined the newly formed Solihull Moors.

Morrison was appointed Head Fitness coach at Swindon Tow
n FC in 2009 until 28 June 2011 when he was appointed fitness coach at Sheffield United. In 2014 he joined Wolverhampton Wanderers as a Sports Scientist.

References

External links

1974 births
Living people
People from the London Borough of Waltham Forest
English footballers
Association football midfielders
Chelmsford City F.C. players
Peterborough United F.C. players
Rushden & Diamonds F.C. players
Leyton Orient F.C. players
Dover Athletic F.C. players
Bohemian F.C. players
Tamworth F.C. players
Kidderminster Harriers F.C. players
Moor Green F.C. players
Solihull Moors F.C. players
English Football League players
League of Ireland players
National League (English football) players
Sheffield United F.C. non-playing staff
Wolverhampton Wanderers F.C. non-playing staff
Expatriate association footballers in the Republic of Ireland
Association football coaches
Swindon Town F.C. non-playing staff